CAMY may refer to:
 Center on Alcohol Marketing and Youth, a research and advocacy organization in the United States
 Communauté d'agglomération de Mantes-en-Yvelines, an administrative entity in the Yvelines département, near Paris.